Manorville was a railroad station on the Main Line of the Long Island Rail Road in Manorville, New York. The station was built in 1844 and closed in 1968.

History
Manorville station originally opened on July 29, 1844 as "St. George’s Manor" station, and later shortened to "Manor Station." According to local history, the first station agent, Seth Raynor, who was a patriot during the American Revolutionary War, painted over the "St. George’s," leaving "Manor" exposed, because it reminded him of colonial domination. The town name changed to Manorville with opening of the post office, but timetables and LIRR documents retained the name "Manor" until either 1907 or 1908.

The first station house was razed in September 1869, the same year that Manorville became the western terminus of the Sag Harbor Branch, which was built by Oliver Charlick to prevent the South Side Railroad of Long Island from extending its main line east of Patchogue. After the LIRR acquired the SSRRLI, Charlick extended the now Brooklyn and Montauk Railroad to Eastport Station in 1881, and when the Montauk Branch was extended between Bridgehampton to Montauk in 1895, this section between Manorville and Eastport was renamed the Manorville Branch. Manorville was also intended to be the terminus of one of two formerly proposed extensions of the Wading River Branch.  The second station house was built in May 1871, and was finally renamed "Manorville" approximately in 1910. This station was razed in June 1941 and replaced with a sheltered shed. By 1949, the Manorville Branch was abandoned. The station was finally razed in 1968 and discontinued as a station stop. A former hotel and restaurant now known as The Maples Inn, which served commuters from both branches, still exists to this day.

References

External links
Manorville Branch maps and photos from 1949 and earlier (TrainsAreFun.com)
Unofficial LIRR History Website
Manorville to Eastport Branch
1922 Photo (Ron Ziel collection)
Manorville(Sag Harbor) Branch (Arrt's Arrchives)

Railway stations in the United States opened in 1844
Railway stations closed in 1968
Former Long Island Rail Road stations in Suffolk County, New York
Brookhaven, New York
1844 establishments in New York (state)
1968 disestablishments in New York (state)